The 1946–47 season was Mansfield Town's ninth season in the Football League and fourth and final season in the Third Division South, they finished in bottom in 22nd position with 28 points and were transferred back to the Third Division North.

Final league table

Results

Football League Third Division South

FA Cup

Squad statistics
 Squad list sourced from

References
General
 Mansfield Town 1946–47 at soccerbase.com (use drop down list to select relevant season)

Specific

Mansfield Town F.C. seasons
Mansfield Town